"Gather in the Mushrooms" is a comedy song by Benny Hill, recorded and released by Pye Records in 1961, under the production of Tony Hatch. It reached #12 on the UK Singles Chart. It was covered by Bogshed on a John Peel session in October 1985.

References

Benny Hill songs
1961 songs
1961 singles
Pye Records singles
Song recordings produced by Tony Hatch
Comedy songs